The men's 400 metres event at the 1994 Commonwealth Games was held on 22 and 23 August at the Centennial Stadium in Victoria, British Columbia.

Medalists

Results

Heats

Quarterfinals

Semifinals

Final

References

400
1994